Jorge Ferreira is the name of:
 Jorge Isaac Baltazar Ferreira or Jorge Baltazar, Mexican squash player
 Jorge Ferreira (footballer) (born 1966), Portuguese football player
 Jorge Ferreira (football manager) (born 1984), Brazilian football manager